"Give Me Something" is a house song performed by French DJ David Guetta, featuring vocals from singer-songwriter Barbara Tucker. The track was released as the fourth single from his debut studio album, Just a Little More Love. The single was only released in France. No music video exists for the track.

Track listing
 French CD single
 "Give Me Something" (Fonkyfunk Mix) – 7:32
 "Give Me Something" (Extended Original Mix) – 7:29
 "It's Allright" (Bob Sinclar Remix) – 6:31
 "It's Allright" (Extended Original Mix) – 5:45
 "Give Me Something" (Radio Edit) – 3:15

References

External links
 http://www.davidguetta.com/#/disco/disc/4234338527
 http://www.discogs.com/David-Guetta-Give-Me-Something/master/91046
 http://www.austriancharts.at/showitem.asp?interpret=David+Guetta+feat%2E+Barbara+Tucker&titel=Give+Me+Something&cat=s

2002 singles
David Guetta songs
Songs written by David Guetta
2002 songs
Songs written by Joachim Garraud